Bebside is a village and former civil parish, now in the parish of Blyth, in Northumberland, in England. It is situated to the west of Blyth. It was formerly a mining village, the mine associated with the village operated between 1858 and 1926. It was served by Bebside railway station, from 1850 to 1964. In 1911 the parish had a population of 58.

Governance 
Bebside was formerly a township in Horton parish, from 1866 Bebside was a civil parish in its own right until it was abolished on 1 April 1920 to form Blyth.

References

External links

Villages in Northumberland
Former civil parishes in Northumberland
Blyth, Northumberland